James Pritchard may refer to:

 James Pritchard (boxer) (born 1961), heavyweight boxer
 James Pritchard (politician) (1763–1813), politician who served in the legislatures of the Northwest Territory, and in Ohio
 James Pritchard (rugby union) (born 1979), Australian-Canadian rugby union player and former rugby league footballer
 James B. Pritchard (1909–1997), American archeologist 
 Jim Pritchard (1948–2014), Canadian ice hockey player

See also
 James Cowles Prichard (1786–1848), English physician and ethnologist